Route nationale 44  (RN44) is a secondary highway in Madagascar, running from Moramanga to Amboavory along the eastern banks of Lake Alaotra until its junction with the RN 3a.

Only 50 km of this road are paved and in good state.

Selected locations on route (from north to south)
Amboavory (at 228 km from Moramanga)
Imerimandroso (at 210 km from Moramanga)
Ambatondrazaka  (at 158 km from Moramanga)
Ambalabako
Ankazotsaravolo
Manakambahiny Andrefana
- junction with RN 3A
Vohidiala ((133 km from Moramanga/RN 2)
Andranokabaka
Ameitanimataty
Bembary
Amboasary Gara (60 km from Moramanga/RN 2)
Ambohibola
Ilampy
Morarano Gare
Marovoay, Alaotra-Mangoro
Ambohimanarivo
Ampitambe
Ambodirano village
Moramanga (junction with RN 2)

References

Roads in Madagascar
Alaotra-Mangoro
 Roads in Alaotra-Mangoro